Pakistan Idol was a Pakistani reality singing competition that was a part of the Idols franchise created by Simon Fuller and owned by 19 Entertainment and FremantleMedia. It was the 50th adaptation of the familiar reality competition format introduced in the British series Pop Idol in 2001. It is developed for the Pakistani entertainment market by Geo TV.

Geo TV acquired the production rights for Pakistan Idol as early as 2007 but could not begin production due to the security conditions in the country and abstruse quandaries of production. The production officially began in September 2013 when three prominent celebrities from the Pakistan entertainment industry were chosen to constitute the judging panel for the show. The series was officially launched on 19 September 2013 with the initial auditions beginning the same day and continuing until 25 October 2013. It was first broadcast on television on 6 December 2013.

The series aims to find new solo recording artists from across Pakistan and the winner would be decided by viewers' votes through the Internet, telephone and text messages. A series of 41 episodes are planned for the first season with special behind-the-scenes episodes which will be aired during the finals week. The series attracted tens of thousands of people from across the 850 cities, towns and villages in Pakistan while the series' official telecom sponsor Mobilink reported that it received 10,861 call-in entries through its mobile auditions after the lines were opened for general public. The Geo TV management is hopeful the series would boost its target rating point average; however due to the strict advertising guidelines set by Ofcom, the series saw delays in its launch on the United Kingdom screens.

History 
Pakistan Idol is an adaptation of the reality singing competition Pop Idol created in 2001 by Simon Fuller's production company 19 Entertainment. The idea for the show was introduced to Fuller by Nigel Lythgoe had been inspired by the New Zealand reality show Popstars. Fuller and Lythgoe used the Popstars formula of employing a panel of judges to audition and select singer while also adding other elements such telephone voting by the viewing public (an idea already used in singing competitions like the Eurovision Song Contest), dramatic back-stories of contestants and real-life unfolding of soap opera in real time.

Pop Idol debuted in 2001 in Britain with Lythgoe as the producer and Simon Cowell as one of the judges. The television format saw instant success with the viewing public. Ten years later, Pakistan Idol became the 50th adaptation of this popular television format, based on the original Pop Idol series.

Imran Aslam, president of Geo TV, had acquired the production rights for Pakistan Idol from FreemantleMedia in 2007, but could not continue any further with the production because of the security issues in Pakistan. War against Taliban occupation broke out in north-western Pakistani province of Khyber Pakhtunkhwa bringing production to a halt. Among other problems, the series' director of content and production Saad Bin Mujeeb also cited various abstruse quandaries of production that held back production for another six years. Mujeeb acknowledged that "the security situation has not improved much" but their production company has gotten used to "dealing with [such] threats".

Production finally began in 2013 when the core team including Noor ul Huda, Qudsia Karim Waqar Khan and the HOD Saad bin Mujeeb show's producers picked a group of celebrities from the Pakistan entertainment industry to constitute the panel of judges. There was speculation about who would make it to the judges' panel. The panel was confirmed in due course and included renowned singer Hadiqa Kiani, sufi rock band Junoon's lead vocalist Ali Azmat, and television presenter Bushra Ansari. Television actor Mohib Mirza was selected to host the show, while the official theme for Pakistan Idol was performed by Ali Zafar.

The series was launched on 19 September 2013 after the management at Geo TV were confident about their "security measures" and "[ability] to take on this massive undertaking". Speaking at the launch ceremony, Imran Aslam said that Pakistan had "a history of producing talented musicians across genres" and this series would aim to revive this "cherished" cultural tradition. The initial auditions began on 19 September 2013 and continued until 25 October 2013. The series was first broadcast on 6 December 2013.

Judges and Hosts

Judges
Pakistan Idol had three judges: Bushra Ansari, Hadiqa Kiani, and Ali Azmat for first season. The judges' panel for the first season was officially unveiled on a special transmission of the Geo TV morning show Poora Pakistan on 20 November 2013. Ansari is a veteran television presenter, actress and comedian. She is a trained singer who joined the television industry by mimicking the singing styles of Noor Jehan. Although, she is mostly known for the various characters she played on television in the 80s and 90s. Kiani is one of the most renowned female pop stars in Pakistan. She received classical singing training under Ustad Faiz Ahmed Khan and Wajid Ali Nashad. She first appeared on television in a PTV show called Angan Angan Taray and later chose a solo singing career in the late-90s after singing playback for Pakistani movies like Sargam. The third judge, Azmat, is the front-man of the Pakistani sufi rock band, Junoon. In 2001, he became the first person ever to perform at the United Nations General Assembly along with an Indian band choosing to sing his song "Dosti" (English: "Friendship"), an aptly chosen title to promote the UN's mission in bringing peace to the world. In 2003, Ali performed live at the Royal Albert Hall in London, United Kingdom. His harsh critique on Pakistan Idol has led many to compare him with Simon Cowell leading to an angry backlash from the show's viewers.

Hosts
The show was hosted by television and film actor Mohib Mirza, with some segments was co-hosted by Anoushey Ashraf.

Selection process

Contestant eligibility
At the series launch ceremony, the show-runners confirmed that the eligibility age for contestants would be between 15 and 30 years. The contestants also ought to be legal Pakistani residents and must not hold any current recording or talent representation contract.

Initial auditions
Participants have to register themselves for the initial audition through text subscriptions. These auditions are held in various cities throughout Pakistan but the television broadcasts may only feature auditions in larger cities like Lahore, Faisalabad, Islamabad etc.

Since the number of auditioning contestants may well exceed 10,000 for each city, the contestants have to go through several cuts. The contestants have to first audition in front of selectors, which may include one of the show's producers. Only a few hundred participants make past this preliminary round of auditions. Successful contestants are then allowed to proceed to audition in front of the judges' panel. The judges then select around 80–100 successful contestants from the preliminary round based on their singing abilities and personalities. Selected participants are then handed a "golden ticket" for a trip to Karachi, allowing them to proceed to the next round of the selection process.

For contestants that are unable to make it to the initial auditions, the show's sponsors run special audition drives such as the Clear Last Chance Auditions enabling more people to have a go at auditioning in front of the judges.

Theatre round and Piano shows
Successful contestants from the initial auditions continue to the venue in Karachi for the next round—the "Theatre round". The contestants are given another chance to perform in front of the judges, albeit in a staged theatre environment where the judges narrow down their choices to a group of 24 contestants, known as the "final 24".

These 24 contestants then proceed to the next round—the "Piano shows" round. Here, the contestants are divided into groups of 8 and perform live over a period of 3 days. The list of contestants is further narrowed down to 10 contestants. Here, the television viewers are given their first chance to vote for one contestant (from amongst those not selected) to be included in the list of contestants proceeding to the next round. The most-voted contestant joins the successful contestants as a "wildcard entrant".

Audience voting
By following the format of the franchise, the fate of all the final-listed 12–13 is decided by public vote. During the contestant's performance as well as the recap at the end, a toll-free telephone number for each contestant is displayed on the screen. For an 8-hour period after the episode ends (up to twelve hours for the finale), viewers may call or send a text message to their preferred contestant's telephone number, and each call or text message is registered as a vote for that contestant. Viewers are allowed to vote as many times as they can within the 8-hour voting window. However, the show reserves the right to discard votes by power dialers. One or more of the least popular contestants may be eliminated in successive weeks until a winner emerges.

Semi-finals 
The semi-finals round of show may consist of five or six contestants and may split into different groups to perform individually in their respective night. The men and women sang separately on consecutive nights, and the bottom two in each groups were eliminated each week until only six of each remained to form the top twelve.

Finals
In the finals, the three remaining contestants perform to determine the winner. One will be eliminated from three a few hours earlier and then from the last two, winners will be declared.

Reward for winners and finalist 

At the grand finale of the show, two or three finalists will duel and the contestant who will receive the largest percentage of votes will be the adjudged winner. The winner will be awarded prize money and a recording contract in addition to the title of Pakistan Idol.

Series overview and season synopsis 
Pakistan Idol premiered with its first season in December 2013. The series is currently in its second phase of the selection process for the first season and is already being hailed as a "watershed" moment in the history of music in Pakistan.

Season 1

The first season of Pakistan Idol mark its debut on 6 December 2013 on Geo Network. It was hosted by Mohib Mirza.

Initial auditions for the first season of Pakistan Idol started on 19 September 2013 and continued until 25 October 2013, and were finally broadcast on Geo TV on 6 December 2013. Auditions were organised in various cities throughout Pakistan including urban centres like Islamabad and Karachi, and areas as far flung as Hunza Valley, Swat, Nawabshah and Naushahro Feroze. However, when the show was eventually broadcast, only the auditions organised in major cities were features in the episodes. The auditions featured in the episodes include The Centaurus Mall in Islamabad, Faisalabad, Lahore, Multan, Sukkur, Hyderabad and finally Karachi. At the end of the initial auditions, 86 contestants were selected to proceed to the second phase of the selection process and were given a "golden ticket" to perform in Karachi. Later o they were directly cut to 45 and then they have to pass three major theatre rounds, furthermore judges narrows the contestants down to final 24, for the semi-finals, with 13 going to finals. Initially 12 were planned for finals, but later on one wild card show swiped by Kashif Ali. Two of the favourites Kashif Ali and Waqas Ali was eliminated in the beginning and middle of the shows, resulting in criticism by viewers and allegations about the voting system.

The final show down was between Muhammad Shoaib one of the favourites and Zamad Baig. Both were not expected as the show final finalists but Shoaib was heavily voted by the audience throughout the show, though the performance graph of Shoaib had been very queer but he manages to secure seat in finals. Zammad throughout impressed the judges and audience by his Sufi's genre songs, and eventually won the crown on 27 April 2014.

The coronation song of Zamad will be announced soon, he has signed a contract with Geo Television as a winning prize but released date is not confirmed yet.

Official theme song

The original theme music of Idols TV series has been composed by Julian Gingell, Barry Stone and Cathy Dennis, which was also used as opening theme in Pakistan Idol. However, an anthem "Awaaz Mein Teri" was released on 7 December 2013 to promote the series in Pakistan. The anthem concept was created by Ali Zafar; who wrote, composed and sung the song. Shani Arshad and Soheb Akhtar served for the song as music director and music video director respectively.

Reception

Critical reception
The premiere episode was broadcast on Geo TV on 6 December 2013 and opened to a critical acclaim. The humiliating attitudes of the show's judges however were not entirely welcomed by the television audiences with various people condemning the judges' mockery on social media with a public petition attracting almost 1500 signatures and demanding apologies from the show's management in this regard.
The judges have also raised the ire of some with their recent rejection of a talented young girl from Punjab named Maria Meer, who became a sort of social media celebrity after her appearance on the show.

Controversies
From the inception of show, back in 2007, Pakistan Idol faces many problems and immense negative response by audience which leads to stop the production of franchise, it then took six years to handle all the problems and show finally went on air in late 2013. Owing to the production with linearly, shows became icon of the year, all the perceptions went wrong and series garnered millions views.

Saray Gama, a production house based in the United Kingdom, accused Pakistan Idol of violating their copyrights when the series' sponsors used songs used in the show on their individual websites. The production house claimed that the production rights acquired by the show do not naturally extend to promotional material used by their sponsors.

After the selection of 24 semi-finalist race begins to reach at place of Top 13, and the fate of 24 contestants to winner was put on audience by public voting. With the Top 13, contestants like Mehwish, Waqas and Sajid which had been consistent throughout the show were eliminated after facing public votes, this affects and arise many questions on voting system, Judges were left mournful and doleful with the departure of consistent singers, therefore, production of series overviews the voting system and announce that an individual with one number can give maximum 25 Votes to contestants, above that figure no vote will be counted and one vote cost reported Rs. 0.50 Paisa + Tax.

During the auditions, show went through the limelight of controversial happening, when in Faisalabad auditions a young girl Maria Meer was rejected by all three judges on course of the immaturity and lean voice of her. The audition episode went viral and a blog war started against judges. Maria became a sort of social media celebrity after her appearance on the show. Her rejection got too much attention that famous writer, broadcaster and journalist Raza Ali Abidi stated on his social networking site that: "A girl who is treated so badly in trials of show, i wish some channel with good producers must have done a great-show with her. I need your positive response!". After much controversial act, aspiring singer-songwriter and producer Amanat Ali approaches to Maria Meer family and decided to launch a music video with her. In album of Amanat "Aas", song "Naina Lagay" featuring Maria and himself was recorded, online release of song got much acclaim and Amanat received critical acclaim and appraisal for his step. Maria was invited and approached by many media personalities for interviews and programs.

Revenue and commercial ventures

Media sponsorship
CLEAR and Pepsi are the two foremost sponsors of Pakistan Idol in its first season. Q Mobile and Mobilink are the official telecom partners of the reality show.

 CLEAR – The sponsor is featured on promotional material for the show and also organised a special online audition drive called CLEAR Last Chance Auditions to give people, who missed the initial auditions, another chance.
 Pepsi – Cups bearing the sponsor's logo are featured prominently on the judges' table. 
 Mobilink – The cellular company is promoted as the show's chosen provider for text votes. The company also organised a mobile audition drive in which contestants were able to record a 60-second audition to be evaluated by the judges.
 QMobile – The sponsor's logo is issued in promotional material with the by-line "powered by QMobile".

See also 

 Coke Studio (Pakistani TV program)
 Nescafé Basement
 Acoustic Station

References

External links 

 
 
 Pakistan Idol on Geo TV

Pakistan Idol